William Thomas Parker (August 29, 1928 – January 25, 2014) was an American politician who served in the Virginia House of Delegates and Virginia Senate. He was narrowly defeated for reelection in 1987 by lawyer Mark Earley.

References

External links

1928 births
2014 deaths
Democratic Party members of the Virginia House of Delegates
Democratic Party Virginia state senators
20th-century American politicians